Morgh-e Kuchak (also Romanized as Morgh-e Kūchak and Morgh-e Kūchek) is a village in Mahur Rural District, Mahvarmilani District, Mamasani County, Fars Province, Iran. At the 2006 census, its population was 58, in 13 families.

References 

Populated places in Mamasani County